Project Runeberg is a digital cultural archive initiative that publishes free electronic versions of books significant to the culture and history of the Nordic countries. Patterned after Project Gutenberg, it was founded by Lars Aronsson and colleagues at Linköping University and began archiving Nordic-language literature in December 1992. As of 2015 it had accomplished digitization to provide graphical facsimiles of old works such as the Nordisk familjebok, and had accomplished, in whole or in part, the text extractions and copyediting of these as well as esteemed Latin works and English translations from Nordic authors, and sheet music and other texts of cultural interest.

Nature and history 
Project Runeberg is a digital cultural archive initiative patterned after the English-language cultural initiative, Project Gutenberg; it was founded by Lars Aronsson and colleagues at Linköping University, especially within the university group Lysator (see below), with the aim of publishing free electronic versions of books significant to the culture and history of the Nordic countries. The Project began archiving its first Nordic-language literature pieces (parts of the Fänrik Ståls Sägner, of Nordic dictionaries and of a Bible from 1917) in December 1992.

Name 
In its naming, a moniker similar to "Gutenberg" was desired. The Project was thereby given the name of Finland's national poet Johan Ludvig Runeberg, and so contained a further allusion based on the meanings of its component parts — Rune (letter in Runic script) and berg (mountain) — so that in most Nordic languages it can be translated loosely as "mountain of letters".

Achievements 

The Project began archiving Nordic-language literature in December 1992. As of 2015 it had accomplished digitization to provide graphical facsimiles of old works such as the Nordisk familjebok, and had accomplished, in whole or in part, the text extractions and copyediting of these as well as esteemed Latin works and English translations from Nordic authors – e.g., Carl August Hagberg's interpretations of Shakespeare's plays – and sheet music and other texts of cultural interest.

Technology 
By 2001, technology – image scanning and optical character recognition techniques – had improved enough to allow full digitization and text extraction of important target texts, e.g., of both print editions of the Nordisk familjebok (45,000 pages). Project Runeberg is hosted by an academic computer group, Lysator, at Linköping University, in Linköping in southern Sweden.

See also 
 Open content
 Project Gutenberg
 List of Danish online encyclopedic resources

References

External links 

 

Nordic literature
Swedish digital libraries